The Elberfeld uprising was one of the revolutionary movements in Germany in 1849, part of the German Constitution campaign.

1849 in Germany
German revolutions of 1848–1849
Conflicts in 1849